Côme Levin (born September 11, 1990) is a French actor.

Following a number of small roles, he first became widely known for his performance as Jérémy in the 2012 comedy film Radiostars, for which he was named to the initial Révélations longlist for the César Award for Most Promising Actor.

Filmography

Film

Television

References

External links

1990 births
Living people
21st-century French male actors
French male film actors
French male television actors
Male actors from Paris